South Carolina Highway 245 (SC 245) is a  state highway in the U.S. state of South Carolina. The highway was built and paved in 1932 as a short spur of SC 24 passing north through Leesville to connect with SC 391.  Since being built, that section of SC 24 was redesignated as US 178 in 1933, and Leesville merged in 1992 with Batesburg, where US 1 and SC 391 intersect, to form the town of Batesburg-Leesville. It is known locally as North Lee Street north of the railroad tracks, and as South Lee Street south of the railroad tracks. There are two traffic lights along SC 245.

Major intersections

See also

References

External links

SC 245 at Virginia Highways' South Carolina Highways Annex

245
Transportation in Lexington County, South Carolina